Woodend, Cumbria may refer to:

 Woodend, Egremont, Cumbria
 Woodend, Ulpha, Cumbria